Rothery is a surname most common in East Sussex in England, where more than 5 per cent of all people with this surname live and where it is the 14th  most common surname with 3,359 bearers.

People
Agnes Rothery (1888–1954), American author
Casey Anne Rothery (1993-), child actress who played Lucy Beale in British soap opera EastEnders
David Rothery, British planetary science professor
Henry Cadogan Rothery (1817–1888), English lawyer
James Rothery (1876-1919, English cricketer 
Steve Rothery (1959-), English rock guitarist
Teryl Rothery (1962-), Canadian actress
Thomas ap Rhodri (also known as Thomas Rothery, c. 1300 – 1363), Welsh prince
William Hume-Rothery (1899–1968), English metallurgist
William Rothery (1775–1864), British lawyer

Other
Hume-Rothery rules, rules describing the conditions under which an element could dissolve in a metal, named after William Hume-Rothery